The 1970–71 season was Liverpool Football Club's 79th season in existence and their ninth consecutive season in the First Division. The rebuilding of Liverpool F.C. continued into 1970-71 as many of the side who came in the previous season began to make their presence felt with the club. Although they had finished fifth in the football league, Ray Clemence, Larry Lloyd, and Alec Lindsay all begin to emerge in their second season of first-team action. Two players would figure well into the seventies; Steve Heighway who joined from Skelmersdale United in May 1970 and became a regular in his full season with the club.

John Toshack was bought from Cardiff City in November 1970 for £110,000, and became an instant hero by scoring in the Merseyside derby versus Everton F.C. a few weeks later. The rebuilding of the side from the 1960s was beginning to take shape and although they finished fifth in the First Division, it seemed that Bill Shankly would be emerging with a team that would be challenging for major trophies in the next few years. One signing which took place a few days before they finished runners-up in the FA Cup final was the signing of Kevin Keegan from Scunthorpe United for £35,000.

However, the team showed that the future would look promising by losing in the FA Cup final to League and Cup double winners Arsenal and losing on aggregate 1-0 in the semi-finals to Leeds United who end up being the eventual and last winners of the Fairs Cup.

Squad

Goalkeepers
  Ray Clemence
  Tommy Lawrence

Defenders
  Chris Fagan
  Ron Yeats
  Roy Evans
  Chris Lawler
  Alec Lindsay
  Larry Lloyd
  Ian Ross
  John McLaughlin
  Tommy Smith

Midfielders
  Steve Arnold
  Ian Callaghan
  Brian Hall
  Steve Heighway
  Emlyn Hughes
  Doug Livermore
  Ian St. John
  Peter Thompson

Attackers
  Phil Boersma
  Alun Evans
  Bobby Graham
  John Toshack
  Jack Whitham

League table

Results

First Division

Football League Cup

FA Cup

Final

Inter-Cities Fairs Cup

References
 LFC History.net – 1970–71 season
 Liverweb - 1970-71 Season

Liverpool F.C. seasons
Liverpool